Fortunati is an Italian surname. Notable people with the surname include:

Gian Francesco Fortunati
José Fortunati (born 1955), Brazilian lawyer and politician
Leopoldina Fortunati (fl. 1996–present), Italian feminist, theorist, and writer
Michael Fortunati

Italian-language surnames